Lia Amanda (born 2 September 1932) is an Italian former film actress.

Life and career 
Born in Rome as Lia Molfesi, Amanda was the daughter of the character actor Mario Molfesi.

She debuted at very young age with her real name in Mario Monicelli and Steno's Totò cerca casa, in which she played the daughter of Totò. She adopted her stage name since her second film, Cento piccole mamme, in which she also had her first leading role.

After several significant roles in critically appreciated films including Augusto Genina's Tre storie proibite, at the peak of her career, at the 1955 Punta del Este Film Festival Amanda announced her retirement from acting to move in Brasil with her husband, the Argentine businessman Arnaldo Carraro. In 1975 she made a fleeting return to acting with a supporting role in the giallo Nude per l'assassino.

Selected filmography
 Toto Looks for a House (1949)
 One Hundred Little Mothers (1952)
 Past Lovers (1953)
 Alarm in Morocco (1953)

References

External links 

1932 births
Actresses from Rome
Italian film actresses
20th-century Italian actresses
Living people